Dreikikir Rural LLG (sometimes spelled Drekikier Rural LLG) is a local-level government (LLG) of East Sepik Province, Papua New Guinea.

Wards
01. Tumam
02. Moihwak
03. Musungua
04. Taihunge
05. Mosinau
06. Prombil
07. Missim
08. Eimul/Pelnandu
09. Musindai
10. Bana
11. Hambini
12. Waringama
13. Selni
14. Aresili
15. Whaleng
16. Yawatong
17. Lainimguap
18. Krunguanam
19. Yakrumbok
20. King
21. Kofem
22. Sakap
23. Makumauip
24. Tong
25. Kumbun
26. Miringe
27. Yawerng
28. Yambes (Yambes language speakers)
29. Waim/Saiweep
30. Moseng
31. Pagilo
32. Luwaite
33. Selnau

References

Local-level governments of East Sepik Province